Scabies (also sometimes known as the seven-year itch) is a contagious skin infestation by the mite Sarcoptes scabiei. The most common symptoms are severe itchiness and a pimple-like rash. Occasionally, tiny burrows may appear on the skin. In a first-ever infection, the infected person usually develops symptoms within two to six weeks. During a second infection, symptoms may begin within 24 hours. These symptoms can be present across most of the body or just certain areas such as the wrists, between fingers, or along the waistline. The head may be affected, but this is typically only in young children. The itch is often worse at night. Scratching may cause skin breakdown and an additional bacterial infection in the skin.

Scabies is caused by infection with the female mite Sarcoptes scabiei var. hominis, an ectoparasite. The mites burrow into the skin to live and deposit eggs. The symptoms of scabies are due to an allergic reaction to the mites. Often, only between 10 and 15 mites are involved in an infection. Scabies is most often spread during a relatively long period of direct skin contact with an infected person (at least 10 minutes) such as that which may occur during sex or living together. Spread of the disease may occur even if the person has not developed symptoms yet. Crowded living conditions, such as those found in child-care facilities, group homes, and prisons, increase the risk of spread. Areas with a lack of access to water also have higher rates of disease. Crusted scabies is a more severe form of the disease. It typically only occurs in those with a poor immune system and people may have millions of mites, making them much more contagious. In these cases, spread of infection may occur during brief contact or by contaminated objects. The mite is very small and at the limit of detection with the human eye.  It is not readily obvious; factors that aid in detection are good lighting, magnification, and knowing what to look for. Diagnosis is based either on detecting the mite (confirmed scabies), detecting typical lesions in a typical distribution with typical historical features (clinical scabies), or detecting atypical lesions or atypical distribution of lesions with only some historical features present (suspected scabies).

Several medications are available to treat those infected, such as ivermectin or permethrin, crotamiton, and lindane creams. Sexual contacts within the last month and people who live in the same house should also be treated at the same time. Bedding and clothing used in the last three days should be washed in hot water and dried in a hot dryer. As the mite does not live for more than three days away from human skin, more washing is not needed. Symptoms may continue for two to four weeks following treatment. If after this time symptoms continue, retreatment may be needed.

Scabies is one of the three most common skin disorders in children, along with ringworm and bacterial skin infections. As of 2015, it affects about 204 million people (2.8% of the world population). It is equally common in both sexes. The young and the old are more commonly affected. It also occurs more commonly in the developing world and tropical climates. Other animals do not spread human scabies. Infection in other animals is typically caused by slightly different but related mites and is known as sarcoptic mange.

Signs and symptoms 

The characteristic symptoms of a scabies infection include intense itching and superficial burrows. Because the host develops the symptoms as a reaction to the mites' presence over time, typically a delay of four to six weeks occurs between the onset of infestation and the onset of itching. Similarly, symptoms often persist for one to several weeks after successful eradication of the mites. As noted, those re-exposed to scabies after successful treatment may exhibit symptoms of the new infestation in a much shorter period—as little as one to four days.

Itching
In the classic scenario, the itch is made worse by warmth, and is usually experienced as being worse at night, possibly because distractions are fewer. As a symptom, it is less common in the elderly.

Rash
The superficial burrows of scabies usually occur in the area of the finger webs, feet, ventral wrists, elbows, back, buttocks, and external genitals. Except in infants and the immunosuppressed, infection generally does not occur in the skin of the face or scalp. The burrows are created by excavation of the adult mite in the epidermis.  Acropustulosis, or blisters and pustules on the palms and soles of the feet, are characteristic symptoms of scabies in infants.

In most people, the trails of the burrowing mites are linear or S-shaped tracks in the skin, often accompanied by rows of small, pimple-like mosquito or insect bites. These signs are often found in crevices of the body, such as on the webs of fingers and toes, around the genital area, in stomach folds of the skin, and under the breasts.

Symptoms typically appear two to six weeks after infestation for individuals never before exposed to scabies. For those having been previously exposed, the symptoms can appear within several days after infestation. However, symptoms may appear after several months or years.

Crusted scabies 

The elderly, disabled, and people with impaired immune systems, such as those with HIV/AIDS, cancer, or those on immunosuppressive medications, are susceptible to crusted scabies (also called Norwegian scabies). On those with weaker immune systems, the host becomes a more fertile breeding ground for the mites, which spread over the host's body, except the face. The mites in crusted scabies are not more virulent than in noncrusted scabies; however, they are much more numerous (up to two million). People with crusted scabies exhibit scaly rashes, slight itching, and thick crusts of skin that contain large numbers of scabies mites. For this reason, persons with crusted scabies are more contagious to others than those with typical scabies. Such areas make eradication of mites particularly difficult, as the crusts protect the mites from topical miticides/scabicides, necessitating prolonged treatment of these areas.

Cause

Scabies mite

In the 18th century, Italian biologists Giovanni Cosimo Bonomo and Diacinto Cestoni (1637–1718) described the mite now called Sarcoptes scabiei, variety hominis, as the cause of scabies. Sarcoptes is a genus of skin parasites and part of the larger family of mites collectively known as scab mites. These organisms have eight legs as adults, and are placed in the same phylogenetic class (Arachnida) as spiders and ticks.

S. scabiei mites are under 0.5 mm in size, but are sometimes visible as pinpoints of white.  Gravid females tunnel into the dead, outermost layer (stratum corneum) of a host's skin and deposit eggs in the shallow burrows. The eggs hatch into larvae in three to ten days. These young mites move about on the skin and molt into a "nymphal" stage, before maturing as adults, which live three to four weeks in the host's skin. Males roam on top of the skin, occasionally burrowing into the skin. In general, the total number of adult mites infesting a healthy hygienic person with noncrusted scabies is small, about 11 females in burrows, on average.

The movement of mites within and on the skin produces an intense itch, which has the characteristics of a delayed cell-mediated inflammatory response to allergens. IgE antibodies are present in the serum and the site of infection, which react to multiple protein allergens in the body of the mite. Some of these cross-react to allergens from house dust mites. Immediate antibody-mediated allergic reactions (wheals) have been elicited in infected persons, but not in healthy persons; immediate hypersensitivity of this type is thought to explain the observed far more rapid allergic skin response to reinfection seen in persons having been previously infected (especially having been infected within the previous year or two).

Transmission
Scabies is contagious and can be contracted through prolonged physical contact with an infested person.  This includes sexual intercourse, although a majority of cases are acquired through other forms of skin-to-skin contact.  Less commonly, scabies infestation can happen through the sharing of clothes, towels, and bedding, but this is not a major mode of transmission; individual mites can survive for only two to three days, at most, away from human skin at room temperature. As with lice, a latex condom is ineffective against scabies transmission during intercourse, because mites typically migrate from one individual to the next at sites other than the sex organs.

Healthcare workers are at risk of contracting scabies from patients, because they may be in extended contact with them.

Pathophysiology
The symptoms are caused by an allergic reaction of the host's body to mite proteins, though exactly which proteins remains a topic of study. The mite proteins are also present from the gut, in mite feces, which are deposited under the skin. The allergic reaction is both of the delayed (cell-mediated) and immediate (antibody-mediated) type, and involves IgE (antibodies are presumed to mediate the very rapid symptoms on reinfection). The allergy-type symptoms (itching) continue for some days, and even several weeks, after all mites are killed. New lesions may appear for a few days after mites are eradicated. Nodular lesions from scabies may continue to be symptomatic for weeks after the mites have been killed.

Rates of scabies are negatively related to temperature and positively related to humidity.

Diagnosis 

Scabies may be diagnosed clinically in geographical areas where it is common when diffuse itching presents along with either lesions in two typical spots or itchiness is present in another household member. The classical sign of scabies is the burrow made by a mite within the skin. To detect the burrow, the suspected area is rubbed with ink from a fountain pen or a topical tetracycline solution, which glows under a special light. The skin is then wiped with an alcohol pad. If the person is infected with scabies, the characteristic zigzag or S pattern of the burrow will appear across the skin; however, interpreting this test may be difficult, as the burrows are scarce and may be obscured by scratch marks. A definitive diagnosis is made by finding either the scabies mites or their eggs and fecal pellets. Searches for these signs involve either scraping a suspected area, mounting the sample in potassium hydroxide and examining it under a microscope, or using dermoscopy to examine the skin directly.

Differential diagnosis 
Symptoms of early scabies infestation mirror other skin diseases, including dermatitis, syphilis, erythema multiforme, various urticaria-related syndromes, allergic reactions, ringworm-related diseases, and other ectoparasites such as lice and fleas.

Prevention of passing on scabies to other people 
Mass-treatment programs that use topical permethrin or oral ivermectin have been effective in reducing the prevalence of scabies in a number of populations. No vaccine is available for scabies. The simultaneous treatment of all close contacts is recommended, even if they show no symptoms of infection (asymptomatic), to reduce rates of recurrence. Since mites can survive for only two to three days without a host, other objects in the environment pose little risk of transmission except in the case of crusted scabies. Therefore, cleaning is of little importance. Rooms used by those with crusted scabies require thorough cleaning.

Management

Treatment
Several medications are effective in treating scabies.  Treatment should involve the entire household, and any others who have had recent, prolonged contact with the infested individual. Options to control itchiness include antihistamines and prescription anti-inflammatory agents. Bedding, clothing and towels used during the previous three days should be washed in hot water and dried in a hot dryer.

Treatment protocols for crusted scabies are significantly  more intense than for common scabies.

Permethrin 
Permethrin, a pyrethroid insecticide, is the most effective treatment for scabies, and remains the treatment of choice. It is applied from the neck down, usually before sleep, and left on for about eight to 14 hours, then washed off in the morning. Care should be taken to coat the entire skin surface, not just symptomatic areas; any patch of skin left untreated can provide a "safe haven" for one or more mites to survive. One application is normally sufficient, as permethrin kills eggs and hatchlings, as well as adult mites, though many physicians recommend a second application three to seven days later as a precaution.  Crusted scabies may require multiple applications, or supplemental treatment with oral ivermectin (below). Permethrin may cause slight irritation of the skin that is usually tolerable.

Ivermectin 
Oral ivermectin is effective in eradicating scabies, often in a single dose. It is the treatment of choice for crusted scabies, and is sometimes prescribed in combination with a topical agent. It has not been tested on infants, and is not recommended for children under six years of age.

Topical ivermectin preparations have been shown to be effective for scabies in adults, though only one such formulation is available in the United States at present, and it is not FDA-approved as a scabies treatment. It has also been useful for sarcoptic mange (the veterinary analog of human scabies).

One review found that the efficacy of permethrin is similar to that of systemic or topical ivermectin. A separate review found that although oral ivermectin is usually effective for treatment of scabies, it does have a higher treatment failure rate than topical permethrin. Another review found that oral ivermectin provided a reasonable balance between efficacy and safety. A study has demonstrated that scabies is markedly reduced in populations taking ivermectin regularly; the drug is widely used for treating scabies and other parasitic diseases particularly among the poor and disadvantaged in the tropics, beginning with the developer Merck providing the drug at no cost to treat onchocerciasis from 1987.

Others 
Other treatments include lindane, benzyl benzoate, crotamiton, malathion, and sulfur preparations. Lindane is effective, but concerns over potential neurotoxicity have limited its availability in many countries. It is banned in California, but may be used in other states as a second-line treatment. Sulfur ointments or benzyl benzoate are often used in the developing world due to their low cost; Some 10% sulfur solutions have been shown to be effective, and sulfur ointments are typically used for at least a week, though many people find the odor of sulfur products unpleasant. Crotamiton has been found to be less effective than permethrin in limited studies. Crotamiton or sulfur preparations are sometimes recommended instead of permethrin for children, due to concerns over dermal absorption of permethrin.

Communities
Scabies is endemic in many developing countries, where it tends to be particularly problematic in rural and remote areas. In such settings, community-wide control strategies are required to reduce the rate of disease, as treatment of only individuals is ineffective due to the high rate of reinfection. Large-scale mass drug administration strategies may be required where coordinated interventions aim to treat whole communities in one concerted effort. Although such strategies have shown to be able to reduce the burden of scabies in these kinds of communities, debate remains about the best strategy to adopt, including the choice of drug.

The resources required to implement such large-scale interventions in a cost-effective and sustainable way are significant. Furthermore, since endemic scabies is largely restricted to poor and remote areas, it is a public health issue that has not attracted much attention from policy makers and international donors.

Epidemiology 
Scabies is one of the three most common skin disorders in children, along with tinea and pyoderma. As of 2010, it affects about 100 million people (1.5% of the population) and its frequency is not related to gender. The mites are distributed around the world and equally infect all ages, races, and socioeconomic classes in different climates. Scabies is more often seen in crowded areas with unhygienic living conditions. Globally as of 2009, an estimated 300 million cases of scabies occur each year, although various parties claim the figure is either over- or underestimated.  About 1–10% of the global population is estimated to be infected with scabies, but in certain populations, the infection rate may be as high as 50–80%.

History 

Scabies has been observed in humans since ancient times. Archeological evidence from Egypt and the Middle East suggests scabies was present as early as 494 BC. In the fourth century BC, Aristotle reported on "lice" that "escape from little pimples if they are pricked" – a description consistent with scabies. Arab physician Ibn Zuhr is believed to have been the first to provide a clinical description of the scabies mites.

Roman encyclopedist and medical writer Aulus Cornelius Celsus (circa 25 BC – 50 AD) is credited with naming the disease "scabies" and describing its characteristic features. The parasitic etiology of scabies was documented by Italian physician Giovanni Cosimo Bonomo (1663–1696) in his 1687 letter, "Observations concerning the fleshworms of the human body". Bonomo's description established scabies as one of the first human diseases with a well-understood cause.

In Europe in the late 19th through mid-20th centuries, a sulfur-bearing ointment called by the medical eponym of Wilkinson's ointment was widely used for topical treatment of scabies. The contents and origins of several versions of the ointment were detailed in correspondence published in the British Medical Journal in 1945.

Society and culture

The International Alliance for the Control of Scabies was started in 2012, and brings together over 150 researchers, clinicians, and public-health experts from more than 15 countries. It has managed to bring the global health implications of scabies to the attention of the World Health Organization (WHO). Consequently, the WHO has included scabies on its official list of neglected tropical diseases and other neglected conditions.

Scabies in animals 

Scabies may occur in a number of domestic and wild animals; the mites that cause these infestations are of different subspecies from the one typically causing the human form. These subspecies can infest animals that are not their usual hosts, but such infections do not last long. Scabies-infected animals experience severe itching and secondary skin infections. They often lose weight and become frail.

The most frequently diagnosed form of scabies in domestic animals is sarcoptic mange, caused by the subspecies Sarcoptes scabiei canis, most commonly in dogs and cats. Sarcoptic mange is transmissible to humans who come into prolonged contact with infested animals, and is distinguished from human scabies by its distribution on skin surfaces covered by clothing.  Scabies-infected domestic fowl develop what is known as "scaly leg". Domestic animals that have gone feral and have no veterinary care are frequently affected by scabies and a host of other ailments. Nondomestic animals have also been observed to develop scabies. Gorillas, for instance, are known to be susceptible to infection by contact with items used by humans, and it is a fatal disease of wombats.

Scabies is also a concern for cattle.

Research
Moxidectin is being evaluated as a treatment for scabies. It is established in veterinary medicine to treat a range of parasites, including sarcoptic mange. Its advantage over ivermectin is its longer half-life in humans, thus potential duration of action.

Tea tree oil appears to be effective in the laboratory setting.

References

Bibliography

External links 

 American Academy of Dermatology pamphlet on Scabies
 Scabies FAQ from the National Pediculosis Association

Parasitic infestations, stings, and bites of the skin
Arthropod infestations
Tropical diseases
Articles containing video clips
Wikipedia medicine articles ready to translate
Wikipedia infectious disease articles ready to translate
Mammal diseases